Indulis Bikše (born 15 September 1995) is a cross-country skier from Madona, Latvia. He started skiing at three and his father is also a skier. Indulis Bikše competed for Latvia at the 2018 Winter Olympics.

References

External links

1995 births
Living people
Cross-country skiers at the 2018 Winter Olympics
Latvian male cross-country skiers
Tour de Ski skiers
Olympic cross-country skiers of Latvia
People from Madona Municipality